Katherine Elizabeth Speed (born 5 October 2001) is an English cricketer who currently plays for Essex, Huntingdonshire and Sunrisers. An all-rounder, she is a right-handed batter and right-arm medium bowler.

Domestic career
Speed made her county debut in 2016, for Essex against Nottinghamshire, scoring 7*. In 2018, she helped her side to promotion from Division 3C of the Twenty20 Cup. In 2021 she took her maiden county wickets, both against Kent in consecutive games on 9 May.

Speed has also played for Huntingdonshire in the East of England Championship in 2020 and 2021, including hitting 62 from 53 balls in a match against Hertfordshire in the 2020 tournament. In 2022, she only played for Essex, playing two matches in the Twenty20 Cup, scoring 45 runs.

In 2021, Speed was selected in the Sunrisers squad for their upcoming season. She made her debut for the side on 29 May, against South East Stars in the Rachael Heyhoe Flint Trophy. She was ever-present in Sunrisers' 2021 Charlotte Edwards Cup campaign, scoring 60 runs including her Twenty20 high score of 26*. She played four matches for Sunrisers in 2022, across the Charlotte Edwards Cup and the Rachael Heyhoe Flint Trophy.

References

External links

2001 births
Living people
Place of birth missing (living people)
Essex women cricketers
Huntingdonshire women cricketers
Sunrisers women's cricketers